Blake Peak is an isolated peak on the southwest side of Siemiatkowski Glacier in Marie Byrd Land. Mapped from surveys by the United States Geological Survey (USGS) and U.S. Navy air photos (1959-65). Named by Advisory Committee on Antarctic Names (US-ACAN) for Dale G. Blake, ionospheric scientist at Byrd Station, 1964.

References

Mountains of Antarctica